is a feminine Japanese given name.

Possible writings
Sumire can be written using different kanji characters and can mean:
菫, "violet"
as a name
紫花, "purple, flower"
純麗, "purity, lovely"
澄玲, "lucidity, sound of jewels"
澄麗, "lucidity, lovely"
The name can also be written in hiragana or katakana.

People with the name
, Japanese fashion model
, Japanese actress
, Japanese speed skater
, Japanese rhythmic gymnast
, better known as Sumire, Japanese fashion model and actress
, Japanese voice actress
, Japanese Go player
, Japanese professional wrestler
, Japanese idol
, Japanese pair skater
, Japanese fencer
, Japanese voice actress
, Japanese musician

Fictional characters
, a character in the anime film Garakowa: Restore the World
Sumire, protagonist of the novel Sputnik Sweetheart
, a character in the manga series Chihayafuru
, a character in the manga series Assassination Classroom
, a character in the media franchise Love Live!
, a character in the anime series Aikatsu!
, a character in the manga series Saki
, a character in the manga series Perman
, protagonist of the manga series Tramps Like Us
, a character in the manga series Boruto
, a character in the light novel series Toradora!
, a character in the media franchise Sakura Wars
, a character in the anime series Sally the Witch
, a character in the manga series The Prince of Tennis
, a character in the manga series K-On!
 Sumire Saitozaki, a character in the video game Yandere Simulator
 
, a character in the anime series Super Doll Licca-chan
, a character in the manga series Gakuen Alice
, protagonist of the manga series Venus Versus Virus
, a character in the manga series The World God Only Knows
, a character in the video game Persona 5 Royal

Japanese feminine given names